This is a list of notable people who are reported to have died from coronavirus disease 2019 (COVID-19) in South Africa, as a result of infection by the virus SARS-CoV-2 during the COVID-19 pandemic.

List

See also

 Deaths in 2020
 Deaths in 2021
 Deaths in 2022
 List of deaths due to COVID-19

References

 
Disease outbreaks in South Africa
2020 in South Africa
2021 in South Africa
Deaths, South Africa
COVID-19